Hongmei railway station is a railway station in Dongguan, Guangdong, China. It is an intermediate stop on the Guangzhou–Shenzhen intercity railway and was opened on 15 December 2019. It takes approximately 18 minutes to travel to Xintang South railway station and an hour to travel to Shenzhen Airport.

The station has two island platforms.

References 

Railway stations in Guangdong
Railway stations in China opened in 2019